Galeimorda is a subgenus of beetles in the family Mordellidae, containing the following species:

Species
 Variimorda caprai (Franciscolo, 1951)
 Variimorda fagniezi (Méquignon, 1946)
 Variimorda fagusai (Méquignon, 1946)
 Variimorda hladili Horák, 1985
 Variimorda krikkeni Batten, 1977
 Variimorda theryi (Méquignon, 1946)

References

Mordellidae
Insect subgenera